Vincenzo Monti (19 February 1754 – 13 October 1828) was an Italian poet, playwright, translator, and scholar, the greatest interpreter of Italian neoclassicism in all of its various phases. His verse translation of the Iliad is considered one of the greatest of them all, with its iconic opening ("Cantami, o Diva, del Pelide Achille,/L'ira funesta[...]", lib. I, verses 1-2) becoming an extremely recognizable phrase among Italians (for example, being the text shown when opening a font file in Microsoft Windows).

Biography
Monti was born in Alfonsine, Province of Ravenna, Emilia-Romagna the son of Fedele and Domenica Maria Mazzari, landowners.  He was educated at the seminar in Faenza and at the University of Ferrara, where he studied medicine and
jurisprudence.

Chronology

In 1775 he is admitted to membership in the Academy of Arcadians and the next year his first book is published: "La visione di Ezechiello" ("Ezekiel's vision").

In 1778 Monti moves to Rome, invited there by cardinal and papal legate in Ferrara, Scipione Borghese. He marries  who bears him a daughter, Costanza,
and a son, Francesco (the latter dies at only two years old). Through her the singer Fanny Eckerlin is his niece.

He published in 1785 his tragedy of "Aristodemo," which was received with great favour. His poem entitled "Bassvilliana," (1793), suggested by the murder of Nicolas Jean Hugou de Basseville, envoy of the French Republic at Rome, had also great popularity, and passed through eighteen editions in six months.

In 1797 he leaves Rome and, after visiting Bologna and Venice, finally settles in Milan, forsaking his former opposition to the French Revolution (expressed in the "Bassvilliana") and becoming a supporter of the newborn Cisalpine Republic.

In 1799, he is forced to leave the city when the French are defeated, but it takes him only two years to come back, following the Battle of Marengo (1800).

While in Paris, Monti devotes more and more of his time to translations from French and Latin, which today are considered to be his best works: he publishes "La Pucelle d'Orleans" by Voltaire, soon to be followed by the "Satire" by Persius and the "Iliade" (Iliad) by Homer.

Soon after his return, Monti published his tragedy of "Caio Gracco," "La Mascheroniana," a poem on the death of his friend Lorenzo Mascheroni, and his beautiful and popular hymn beginning "Bell'Italia," etc. Monti became in 1803 professor of eloquence at Pavia, and on the coronation of Napoleon, in 1805, was appointed his historiographer. He filled this office rather as court poet than historian, and lavished a profusion of eulogistic verses on the emperor and his family. He was created by him a chevalier of the Legion of Honour and of the Iron Crown, and was chosen a member of the Institute of the Kingdom of Italy.

After the fall of Napoleon in 1815, Monti tries to win back the Austrian regime with his last poems "Il mistico omaggio" and "Il ritorno di Astrea", before committing to the development of Italian linguistics during his last years.

Criticism
Many authors have given different opinions about the poet's value. Two factors are generally agreed upon, but they are given different weight yielding a more or less favourable judgement: the lack of ideals and authenticity, and the superior technical skills.

In the fast-changing political scenario of his time, Monti appears not to live up to his ideals: he is blamed from the political point of view for being first an opposer to the French revolution, then an open supporter of Napoleon, then eventually a supporter of the Austrian Empire. Furthermore, he is accused of expressing insincere feelings in his works and of only caring about the formal aspects of his productions.

In a time of strong political ideals such as the "Risorgimento" and strong interior passions such as Romanticism, famous representatives of
Italian literature such as Ugo Foscolo and Giacomo Leopardi pointed to these as unforgivable flaws, whereas in their opinion a poet should never give up his beliefs in exchange for practical advantages, and should prefer a worthy content over a much refined literary technique.

Works

 1776 – "La visione di Ezechiello"
 1779 – "Prosopopea di Pericle" (ode) and  "Saggio di poesie"
 1781 – "La bellezza dell'universo" (short poem)
 1782 – "Sciolti a Sigismondo Chigi" and "Pensieri d'amore"
 1783 – "Versi"
 1784 – "Al signor di Montgolfier" (ode)
 1787 – "Aristodemo" (tragedy)
 1788 – "Galeotto Manfredi"
 1793 – "Bassvilliana"/"In morte di Ugo di Bassville" (left unfinished)
 1797 – "La Musogonia" and "Prometeo"
 1800 – "Poesie", "Dopo la battaglia di Marengo", and translation of Voltaire's "La Pucelle d'Orléans" -> "La pulcella d'Orleans"
 1802 – "Mascheroniana"/"In morte di Lorenzo Mascheroni" (poem) and "Caio Gracco" (tragedy)
 1803 – translation: "Satire" (Persius)
 1805 – "Alla maestà di Napoleone"
 1806 – "Il bardo della Selva Nera", translated into French by Jacques-Marie Deschamps (le Barde de la Forêt-Noire, 1807)
 1810 – translation: "Iliade" (Homer)
 1815 – "Il mistico omaggio"
 1816 – "Il ritorno di Astrea"
 1825 – "Sulla mitologia"
 1817–1826 – "Proposta di alcune correzioni ed aggiunte al Vocabolario della Crusca"

References

Sources 
 Guido Bustico: Bibliografia di Vincenzo Monti. Olschki, Florence 1924
 Cesare Angelini: Carriera poetica di Vincenzo Monti. Fabbri, Milan 1960
 Nicolò Mineo: Vincenzo Monti. La ricerca del sublime e il tempo della rivoluzione. Giardini, Pisa 1992
 Angelo Romano: Vincenzo Monti a Roma. Vecchiarelli, Rome 2001, 
 

Italian male poets
1754 births
1828 deaths
18th-century Italian poets
18th-century Italian male writers
19th-century Italian poets
19th-century Italian male writers
18th-century Italian dramatists and playwrights
19th-century Italian dramatists and playwrights
Members of the Academy of Arcadians
University of Ferrara alumni
Translators of Homer
Italian translators
Latin–Italian translators
French–Italian translators